The Euclidiini are a tribe of moths in the family Erebidae. The tribe was erected by Achille Guenée in 1852.

Genera

Caenurgia
Caenurgina
Callistege
Celiptera
Doryodes
Euclidia
Leucomelas
Mocis
Pantydia
Paramocis
Ptichodis

Possibly belong here

Chamyna
Ctenusa
Discosema
Donectusa
Epidromia
Euonychodes
Homaea
Melapia
Nymbis
Perasia
Phurys
Remigiodes
Scodionyx
Teratocera

References

 
Erebinae
Moth tribes